Imidazolones are a family of heterocyclic compounds, the parents of which have the formula OC(NH)2(CH)2.  Two isomers are possible, depending on the location of the carbonyl (CO) group.  The NH groups are nonadjacent.  A common route to imidazol-2-ones involves condensation of ureas and acyloins.  Some are of interest in the pharmaceuticals.  4-Imidazolones arise from the condensation of amidines with 1,2-dicarbonyls such as glyoxal.

References

Imidazoles